Heritage Farm Museum and Village is an open-air living history museum in Huntington, West Virginia that focuses on Appalachian history and culture. Originally conceived as a location to house and display the private collection of A. Michael "Mike" and Henriella Perry, Heritage Farm has expanded into an entire Appalachian Frontier Village that was recently named West Virginia's first Smithsonian-affiliated museum.

History
In 1973, co-founders Mike and Henriella Perry decided to relocate from Huntington city proper to a farmhouse on the outskirts of town. Their interest was piqued by the old wooden logs they discovered beneath the walls of their house. Their efforts to understand the tools and techniques involved in building a cabin, coupled with their hobby of antiquing, led to the genesis of what would become Heritage Farm. Originally a private collection housed in a nearby barn, they soon began to accumulate authentic old structures and materials that they felt would convey an appreciation for everyday life in Appalachia from the 19th century to the present. Heritage Farm in its current sense began with the first "May Festival" on May 4, 1996. This event was the only day the village was open on an annual basis until 2006. 

Currently, Heritage Farm welcomes guests from May through October on Fridays and Saturdays. In December, 4 evenings are designated as "Christmas Village," during which the buildings are decorated with lights and holiday activities are available.

Museums
Heritage Farm has seven main museum buildings:

Adventure Park 
New to Heritage Farm in 2021, high-ropes courses and a zip line were installed. Guests are encouraged to "Appalachian Up" as they celebrate the spirit of Appalachian adventure. There are 6 components of Heritage Farm categorized as the Adventure Park. Making reservations for activities is highly recommended, being the only way to guarantee a timeslot.

Lodging
In addition to museums, Heritage Farm rents buildings for visitors to lodge in. All the log cabins but one are constructed from 19th-century logs sourced from around West Virginia. Other lodgings of note include a 19th-century dairy barn reconstructed into a conference and retreat center, and a 1940s N&W Caboose with fold-out beds.

Historic Buildings and Implements
In addition to museums and lodging, Heritage Farm has a number of period buildings, as well as machines and implements, used for various tasks in Appalachian everyday life. Some implements are only in use during special festival days.

Attractions

Artisans

Heritage Farm employs local artisans who practice old forms of craftsmanship using authentic, antique equipment related to their professions. Artisans include (but are not limited to) broommakers, weavers, printers, tinsmiths, woodworkers, and blacksmiths. In addition to hosting artisans throughout the week, Heritage Farm also hosts occasional classes given by artisans in the basics of their profession.

Festivals
Events have included old-time music festivals, cast-iron cookoffs, Hatfield and McCoy weekends, Spring Festival, Fall Festival, and Christmas Village. Christmas Village, which occurs on 4 evenings in December, is described as "a spectacular lighted Appalachian village and all your favorite Christmas activities! Visit with Santa, see our live nativity, wagon ride to view lights, Christmas music, visit with Frosty the Snowman, purchase gifts from Heritage Farm Artisans, and more!"

Petting zoo
A petting zoo of farm animals is open to the public on festival days and throughout the summer. Animals include miniature horses, goats, pigs, sheep, rabbits, as well as non-traditional farm animals such as llamas, peacocks, and a camel.

In popular culture
 Featured on an episode of American Pickers that aired 12 December 2011 entitled "Pickin' Perry-dise".
 Provided the filming location for the History Channel documentary "America's Feud: Hatfields and McCoys".
 Featured in Barnwood Builders Season 02 Episode 12 "Grandma's Cabin".

References

External links 
 Official website
 Heritage Farm Facebook Page
Huntington Quarterly article "Adventure Awaits"

Open-air museums in West Virginia
Buildings and structures in Huntington, West Virginia
Museums in Wayne County, West Virginia
Rebuilt buildings and structures in West Virginia
